Tomas Masiulis (born September 19, 1975) is a retired Lithuanian professional basketball player and coach. During his playing career, at a height of 2.05 m (6'8 ") tall, he played at the power forward position. During his coaching career, he was the head coach of Žalgiris-2. He is currently the assistant basketball coach of FC Barcelona.

Professional playing career
Masiulis started his club playing career with Statyba Jonava, in the Lithuanian Second Division (LKAL). After a year, he moved to Žalgiris Kaunas, of the Lithuanian First Division (LKL), where he played until mid-2002. Later, he moved to the Italian League club Montepaschi Siena. 

After finishing the season with that club, he moved to the Polish League club Asseco Prokom Gdynia. At the end of the 2007–2008 season, after that club changed owners, and Masiulis. After he was released, he seriously considered retiring. However, after some of Žalgiris Kaunas' players sustained injuries, Masiulis joined Žalgiris Kaunas again. His contract with Žalgiris Kaunas, which ended on December 16, 2008, was not extended, so Masiulis then signed a contract with Aisčiai Kaunas, on December 17, 2008. After the New Year, he extended the contract through the end of the season.

National team playing career
As a member of the senior Lithuanian national basketball team, Masiulis played at the 1998 FIBA World Championship, and the 1999 EuroBasket. He was also a member of the Lithuanian team that won the bronze medal at the 2000 Summer Olympic Games.

Coaching career
In October 2009, Masiulis became a coach at the basketball school of Žalgiris-2, coaching the Under-14 team. In January 2010, he became an assistant coach with Aisčiai Kaunas. He was next the head coach of Žalgiris-2's main team, which is the reserve team of Žalgiris Kaunas. He led the team to the Lithuanian Second Division (NKL) Finals in 2016 and 2018. He then became an assistant coach with the club's senior men's team, Žalgiris Kaunas, in 2018.

Career statistics

EuroLeague

|-
| style="text-align:left;"| 2000–01
| style="text-align:left;"| Žalgiris
| 5 || 5 || 30.5 || .697 || .333 || .632 || 8.2 || 2.0 || 1.6 || .4 || 12.8 || 19.2
|-
| style="text-align:left;"| 2001–02
| style="text-align:left;"| Žalgiris
| 11 || 10 || 26.0 || .517 || .533 || .545 || 5.9 || 1.7 || 1.1 || .7 || 8.9 || 11.7
|-
| style="text-align:left;"| 2004–05
| style="text-align:left;"| Prokom Trefl Sopot 
| 18 || 17 || 24.0 || .628 || .160 || .391 || 5.4 || 1.7 || 1.2 || .6 || 7.1 || 10.6
|-
| style="text-align:left;"| 2005–06
| style="text-align:left;"| Prokom Trefl Sopot
| 14 || 10 || 23.4 || style="background:#CFECEC;"|.667 || .400 || .367 || 5.6 || 1.8 || .9 || .9 || 5.8 || 10.2
|-
| style="text-align:left;"| 2006–07
| style="text-align:left;"| Prokom Trefl Sopot
| 20 || 19 || 20.1 || .517 || .278 || .733 || 3.9 || 1.0 || 1.0 || .3 || 4.3 || 5.8
|-
| style="text-align:left;"| 2007–08
| style="text-align:left;"| Prokom Trefl Sopot
| 13 || 13 || 21.2 || .478 || .273 || .389 || 3.6 || 1.1 || .8 || .1 || 2.9 || 4.5
|-
| style="text-align:left;"| 2008–09
| style="text-align:left;"| Žalgiris
| 4 || 0 || 12.5 || .000 || .000 || .000 || 2.3 || .8 || .3 || .0 || .0 || .5

Personal life
Masiulis' son, Gytis Masiulis, also is a professional basketball player. He debuted with the primary Žalgiris Kaunas roster in 2017.

References

External links
FIBA Player Profile
Sports-Reference.com Profile
Italian League Player Profile 
Lithuanian League Profile 

1975 births
Living people
1998 FIBA World Championship players
Asseco Gdynia players
Basketball players at the 2000 Summer Olympics
BC Žalgiris players
Lithuanian basketball coaches
Lithuanian men's basketball players
LSU-Atletas basketball players
Medalists at the 2000 Summer Olympics
Mens Sana Basket players
Olympic basketball players of Lithuania
Olympic bronze medalists for Lithuania
Olympic medalists in basketball
Actors from Kaunas
Power forwards (basketball)
Trefl Sopot players
Basketball players from Kaunas